KCVO may refer to:

 Knight Commander of the Royal Victorian Order, a British honour
 the ICAO identifier of Corvallis Municipal Airport in Corvallis, Oregon, United States
 KCVO-FM, a radio station (91.7 FM) licensed to Camdenton, Missouri, United States